Bernie Glassman (January 18, 1939 – November 4, 2018) was an American Zen Buddhist roshi and founder of the Zen Peacemakers (previously the Zen Community of New York), an organization established in 1980. In 1996, he co-founded the Zen Peacemaker Order with his late wife Sandra Jishu Holmes. Glassman was a Dharma successor of the late Taizan Maezumi-roshi, and gave inka and Dharma transmission to several people.

Glassman was known as a pioneer of social enterprise, socially engaged Buddhism and "Bearing Witness Retreats" at Auschwitz and on the streets with homeless people.

According to author James Ishmael Ford, in 2006 he

Biography
Bernie Glassman was born to Jewish immigrants in Brighton Beach, Brooklyn, New York in 1939. He attended university at the Brooklyn Polytechnic Institute and received a degree in engineering. Following graduation he moved to California to work as an aeronautical engineer at McDonnell-Douglas. He then received his Ph.D. in applied mathematics from the University of California, Los Angeles.

Glassman first encountered Zen when he was assigned Huston Smith's The Religions of Man for an English class in 1958. From there, he continued reading including books by Alan Watts, Christmas Humphreys, and D.T. Suzuki. In the early 1960s, Glassman began meditating and soon after sought a local Zen teacher. He found Taizan Maezumi in Los Angeles, California and Glassman became one of the original founding members of the Zen Center of Los Angeles. He received Dharma transmission in 1976 from Maezumi and then inka in 1995 shortly before Maezumi's death.

In 1980, he founded the Zen Community of New York. In 1982 Glassman opened Greyston Bakery in Yonkers, New York, which initially provided jobs for the Zen students and evolved into an effort to help alleviate the widespread homelessness in the area. The bakery provided jobs for inner city residents who lacked education and skills. Greyston employed low-skilled workers from the neighborhood, many of whom were homeless themselves, and sold baked goods to shops and restaurants in Manhattan. In 1989 Glassman entered an agreement with Ben & Jerry's, and Greyston Bakery has become the supplier of brownies for several lines of ice cream.

Through the success of his bakery–which in 2016 was earning $12 million in revenues–Glassman  founded the Greyston Foundation (sometimes called Greyston Mandala) with his wife Sandra Jishu Holmes in 1989. He retired from the Greyston Foundation in 1996 to pursue socially engaged Buddhist projects through the Zen Peacemakers. As of 2004 the Foundation had developed $35 million worth in real estate development projects in Westchester County, New York. The Foundation offers HIV/AIDS programs, provides job training and housing, child care services, educational opportunities, and other endeavors. In 2003 the bakery moved to a new building, which allows for higher output and more employment opportunities.

In 1996 Glassman, with his wife Sandra Jishu Holmes, founded the Zen Peacemaker Order. According to professor Christopher S. Queen, "The order is based on three principles: plunging into the unknown, bearing witness to the pain and joy of the world, and a commitment to heal oneself and the world." Richard Hughes Seager writes, "The Zen Peacemaker Order...has the potential to rival Thich Nhat Hanh's groups and the Buddhist Peace Fellowship as a force in American activism."

Glassman died on November 4, 2018, from complications of a stroke in Springfield, Massachusetts at the age of 79.

Teachings

Glassman taught about what his teacher, the late Taizan Maezumi, called the "unknowing." Not-knowing is the first tenet of the Zen Peacemakers, and Glassman said of it, "In Zen the words source and essence are the equivalent of Unknowing, and they come up again and again. We have the absolute and the relative perspectives about life, and Unknowing is the one source of both of these." Also, Glassman was known for his many "street retreats." Author James Ishmael Ford writes, "...'street retreats,' for instance, moves sesshin into the streets: participants eat in soup kitchens, and, if they know they're not displacing homeless people, sleep in homeless shelters or, otherwise, sleep in public places. Zazen takes place in parks." In the 2000s, Glassman developed an experiment in sociocratic consensus-based zen training and interfaith facilitation, known initially as Peacemaker Circle International, and later Zen Peacemaker Circles. Interconnected projects were established globally, replacing the role of 'Zen teacher' with participants learning from each other and sharing ideas between Circles. Starting in 2001, Glassman taught "Clowning Your Zen" workshops with Moshe Cohen, and founded a "clown order" called the Order of Disorder within the Zen Peacemaker Order. In his last years, having disrobed from the priesthood, Glassman together with his third wife Eve Marko continued the work of his teacher Koryu Osaka Roshi in developing lay forms of Zen practice.

Lineage

Bernie Glassman appointed several "senseis" and "roshis" in traditional zen, and established the non-hierarchical roles of 'Steward' and 'Circle Dharmaholder' as coordinators and visionholders to continue the Zen Peacemaker Circles model. A number of his successors have also given dharma transmission to some of their own students:
 Ancheta, Alfred Jitsudo Roshi
 Arbiter, Eric Kishin Sensei
 Bruce-Fritz, Carol Myoshin Sensei
 Elkin, Rick Issan Sensei
 Fritz, Ralph Kendo Sensei
 Helzer, Douglas Red Heart Sensei
 Walter, Sydney Musai Roshi
 Whalen, Thomas Zenho Sensei
 Baker, Nancy Mujo Roshi
 Barragato, Stefano Mui Sensei (b. 1930)
 Barragato, Margaret Ne-Eka
 Wohl, Peter Seishin Sensei
 Peter Joryu Harris
 Jaime Heiku McLeod
 Todd Hotai Watson
 Paquin, Linda-Lee Abhaya
 Bastien, James Daikan Sensei
 Byalin, Kenneth (Ken) Tetsuji Sensei
 Ciepielewski, Jakub Bokkuren Roshi
 Collande, Cornelius v. Roshi
 Dubois, Michel Roshi
 Gauntt, Grover Genro Sensei
 Gyger, Pia Jinji Roshi
 Halifax, Joan Jiko Roshi
 Bakker, Irene Kaigetsu Sensei
 Byrnes, Brian Joshin Sensei
 Kazniak, Al Genkai Sensei
 Stolte, Beate Sensei
 Palma, José Shinzan Sensei 
 Quennell, Genzan Sensei
 Krajewski, Andrzej Getsugen Roshi
 Harkaspi, Helen Kobai Yuho
 Hixon, Lex Nur Jikai (1941-1995)
 Hixon, Sheila Jinen Sensei
 Holmes, Sandra Jishu Angyo Roshi (1941-1998)
 Kahn, Paul Kuzan Genki Roshi
 Ackerman, Joan Noge
 Brown, Tucker Sansui
 Bruce, Susan Kijin
 Bruner, David Moksui
 Dowd, Cathleen Kanno
 DuFrene Troy Kyokai
 Duncan, Shoko Sings-Alone
 Greenberg, Bill Jikai
 Kahn, Jacks Jocelyn Myoen
 Kahn, Monika Seiryo Genmitsu Roshi
 Johnson, Trish Kojindo
 Mancuso, John Mitsudo
 Kolman, Phil Sengetsu
 Koopalethes, Wally Toryu
 Noble, Greg Tensho
 Peterman, John Reizan
 Sato Gerpheide, Karen C. (KC) Zero Kyozen Sensei
 Schmachtenberg, Wolfgang Okami
 Stern, Paul Kisho Roshi
 Hansen, Eileen Toshin
 Tirch, Dennis Doshini
 Vardi, Eran Kyoka Junryu Roshi
 Wagner, Ann Ankai Roshi
 Senegeto, Thomas Kian Sensei
 Kennedy, Robert E. Jinsen S.J. Roshi (b. 1933-)
 Abels, Gregory Hosho Sensei
 Abels, Janet Jiryu Roshi
 Bachman, Carl Genjo Sensei
 Birx, Charles Shinkai Sensei (b. 1944)
 Pumphrey, Ben Mui Sensei
 Thompson, Scott H. (b. 1948) Dharma Holder (Assistant teacher)
 Birx, Ellen Jikai Roshi (b. 1950)
 Butler, Tim Tomei Sensei
 Cicetti, Raymond Ryuzan Roshi (b. 1950)
 Daniels, Michele Keido Sensei
 Eastman, Patrick Kundo Roshi
 Averbeck, Marcus Hozan Sensei
 Collingwood, Chris Ryushin Sensei
 Woodcock, Jeremy Ryokan Sensei
 Efird, Susan KoDo Sensei
 Healy, Miriam Yukan Roshi
 Holleran, Michael Koryu Sensei
 Hunt, Kevin Jiun Roshi (b. 1933-), O.C.S.O (Order of Cistercians of the Strict Order)
 Taberner, Cynthia Kin Ryu Sensei
 Tacy, Madeleine Seikai Sensei
 Onge, Timothy Mangetsu Sensei
 Seul, Jeff Kōgen Sensei
 Laheen, Mary Soshin Sensei
 Maher, Carl Chimon Sensei
 Montecel, Maria "Cuca" Kosen Roblwedo Sensei
 Richardson, Janet Jinne, CSJP Roshi
 Blackman, Bruce Seiryu Sensei (b. 1942)
 Craig, Barbara Shoshin, RSM Sensei [Religious Sisters of Mercy] (b. 1932)
 Falcone, Anthony Hoetsu Sensei
 Hebb, John Joho Sensei
 Sullivan, Edward Sangetsu Sensei
 Dougherty, Rose Mary Myoan Sensei
 Dietrich, William (Bill) Ji An Sensei
 Ertman, Robert Jin Gen Sensei
 Palmiter, Martine Taikai Sensei
 McQuaide, Rosalie Jishin, CSJP Sensei 
 Schubert, Paul Seiko Sensei
 Yee, Amy Enhai Sensei
 Viggiani, Carl Chimon Sensei
 von Wobeser-Hopfner, Inge Eigen
 Lee, Robert Sokan Roshi
 Lugovina, Francisco Genkoji "Paco" Roshi
 williams, angel Kyodo Sensei
 Nelson, Craig Daiken Sensei
 Salazar, Joaquin Ryusho Sensei
 Marko, Eve Myonen
 Matthiessen, Peter Muryo Roshi (May 22, 1927 – April 5, 2014)
 Bastis, Madeline Ko-i Sensei
 Cantor, Mitchell Doshin Sensei
 May, Wilbur Mushin Sensei 
 Dobbs, Michel Engu Sensei
 Friedman, Dorothy Dai-en (Daien) Sensei
 Campbell, Chodo Sensei
 Paley Ellison, Koshin Sensei
 Maull, Fleet Shinryu Roshi
 Merzel, Dennis Genpo Roshi
 Nakao, Wendy Lou Egyoku Roshi
 Berge, Raul Ensho, Dharma Holder (2006)
 Boyd, Merle Kodo Plum Dragon Sensei 
 Hawley, Kipp Ryodo Sensei
 Janka, Gary Myogen Koan Sensei
 Nordstrom, Louis Mitsunen Roshi (b. 1943)
 Denton, Timothy Issai Sensei
 Hawkins, Roger Sensei
 Thompson, Phil Zenkai Sensei 
 O'Hara, Pat Enkyo Roshi
 Eiger, Randall Ryotan
 Harris, Jules Shuzen
 Rapaport, Al Tendo Fusho
 Linda Myoki Lehrhaupt
 Hondorp, Catherine Anraku Eishun Sensei
 O'Hara, Barbara Joshin Sensei
 Terestman, Julie Myoko Kirin Sensei
 Thomson, Sinclair Shinryu Sensei
Saunders, Anne Seisen
Deer, Herb Eko
Wild, Sara Kokyo
 Singer, Don Ani Shalom Rabbi Sensei
 Richardson, Janet Jinne Roshi
 Waele, Frank de Roshi
 Wegmueller, Barbara Salaam Roshi
 Wegmueller, Roland Yakushi Roshi

Circle Zen Dharmaholders:

 Margueritte Gregory
 Jeana Moore
 Barbara Wegmueller
 Gabriele Blankertz
 Chris Starbuck
 Geoff Taylor and the Western Massachusetts Circle
 Frances Collins
 Steve Hart
 Franziska Schneider
 Kathleen Battke
 Roland Wegmueller
Ohad Pele Ezrahi (Rabbi)

Bibliography

Other media

Audio

Video

Selected honors
 1991 Best of America Award for Social Action, U.S. News & World Report
 Ethics in Action Award, Ethical Culture Society of Westchester
 E-chievement Award, E-Town, Tom's of Maine
 Man of the Year, Westchester Coalition of Food Pantries
 2016 Babson College Lewis Institute Social Innovator Award

Selected board participation
 The Temple of Understanding
 White Plum Asanga
 AIDS Interfaith National Network
 Social Venture Network
 Westchester Interfaith Housing Corp.

See also
 List of peace activists

References

External links 

 Zen Peacemakers
 www.greyston.org/
 www.greystonbakery.com/
 Peacemaker Circles International
 Shambhala Sun interview with Roshi Bernie
 Zen Center of Los Angeles
 White Plum Asanga
 Videos about Zen Peacemakers and Bernie Glassman
 Audio Interview Series on Buddhist Geeks

1939 births
2018 deaths
Zen Buddhism writers
Engaged Buddhists
Engaged Buddhism
Soto Zen Buddhists
White Plum Asanga
Rōshi
20th-century American Jews
American Zen Buddhists
Converts to Buddhism
People from Brighton Beach
Polytechnic Institute of New York University alumni
Writers from Brooklyn